The Race to the Rock is an annual unsupported ultra-distance bicycle race through the Australian Outback organized by Jesse Carlsson. Unlike stage races, such as the Tour De France, ultra-distance races start and run continuously until the competitors finish the race, forcing them to make such strategic choices as whether it would be better to take time to eat or sleep, or to sacrifice those things and press on. Race to the Rock is an unsupported race, which means that racers are not permitted to draft or to obtain help from anything other than publicly available sources that are available for all. The course varies every year, but finishes at Uluru, also known as Ayers Rock, and has been so gruelling that only a very small percentage of the competitors have ever finished the race. Roads are mostly unsealed, with limited water supplies, and stretches of 400-500 kilometres at times with no food resupply available.

History
Carlsson was inspired to create Race to the Rock by the "overlanders" who crossed Australia in the late 19th century when there were no roads, no towns, and no water sources. The course was so tough that only one rider, Sarah Hammond (the only female competitor), was able to complete the first edition. Carlsson competed, but had to withdraw with a broken wrist. Hammond won the race again in 2017 and 2018. In 2017, five riders completed the race: Hammond, Kevin Benkenstein, Jesse Carlsson, Fernando De Andrade and Nicholas Skewes. Benkenstein was the first man to complete the race, with Carlsson having the fastest known time for the 2017 course after a late start caused by a mechanical. In 2018, four riders were able to complete the race: again Hammond, Erinn Klein, Nick Skarajew, and Emma Flukes. Skarajew became the only rider to complete the race on a single speed bike.

In 2019, the race started at Port Douglas, travelling south to Townsville and then inland. The race finish was changed 10 days into the event due to difficulties with obtaining permits for the later parts of the route, with the new finish announced as Alice Springs. Jesse Carlsson had already passed Alice Springs when the finish was changed and was therefore the winner of the event

The 2022 edition of the race began in Sydney and finished in Adelaide.

Results

References

Mountain biking events in Australia
Ultra-distance cycling
Sports competitions in the Northern Territory
Sport in Alice Springs